Nemanja Nešić (Serbian Cyrillic: Немања Нешић) (15 May 1988 – 6 June 2012) was a Serbian rower. He was a member of the national teams of Serbia in the last eight years, won two bronze medals at European Championship 2009, and in 2011, world championships finalist and participant in many important international regattas.

He died unexpectedly in a boat during the morning training in 2012.

References

Further reading
 Bio on Serbian rowing federation

1988 births
2012 deaths
Sportspeople from Smederevo
Serbian male rowers
European Rowing Championships medalists
21st-century Serbian people